The 50 kilometre cross-country skiing event was part of the cross-country skiing programme at the 1952 Winter Olympics. It was the sixth appearance of the event. The competition was held on Wednesday, 20 February 1952. Thirty-six cross-country skiers from 13 nations competed.

Medalists

Results

References

External links
Official Olympic Report
 

Men's cross-country skiing at the 1952 Winter Olympics
Men's 50 kilometre cross-country skiing at the Winter Olympics